English singer Dua Lipa is the recipient of numerous awards. This includes nominations for sixteen Brit Awards, eight Grammy Awards and seven NME Awards, winning six, three and one respectively. She became the first female artist to receive five nominations in a single year at the Brit Awards.

Lipa signed a record deal with Warner Music Group in 2015 and released her self-titled debut album in 2017, which earned her nominations for Album of the Year at the 2017 BBC Music Awards, British Album of the Year at the 2018 Brit Awards, and won International Album of the Year at the thirteenth edition of the LOS40 Music Awards.

The single "New Rules", from her self-titled album, earned nominations for British Single of the Year and Best British Video at the 2018 Brit Awards, Best Music Video at the 2018 iHeartRadio Music Awards and Song of the Year at the 2018 MTV Video Music Awards. The song won Direction for Music Videos at the 2018 D&AD Awards and Best Song To Lip Sync To at the 2018 Radio Disney Music Awards. "One Kiss", a collaboration with Scottish record producer Calvin Harris, and "IDGAF" were also nominated for British Single of the Year and Best British Video at the 2019 Brit Awards. 

Lipa won Best New Artist and Best Dance Recording for "Electricity", a collaboration with British-American duo Silk City, at the 61st Annual Grammy Awards. She released her second studio album, Future Nostalgia, in 2020. It won Best Pop Vocal Album at the 63rd Annual Grammy Awards, and earned a nomination for Album of the Year. The album's lead single, "Don't Start Now" (2019), received nominations for Record of the Year, Song of the Year and Best Pop Solo Performance at the same ceremony.

Awards and nominations

Other accolades

Honorary Ambassador

Notes

References

External links
 List of awards and nominations at the Internet Movie Database
Grammys Awards 2021: Nominations

Lipa, Dua
Awards